The Cali River is a river of western Colombia. It flows through the city of Cali and drains into the Cauca River.  Its headwaters are in the Farallones de Cali of the Cordillera Occidental.

See also
List of rivers of Colombia

References
Rand McNally, The New International Atlas, 1993.

Rivers of Colombia